Elaine O'Neil (born 1946) is an American photographer. Her work is included in the collections of the Smithsonian American Art Museum and the Museum of Fine Arts, Houston.

References

 
1946 births
Living people
20th-century American women artists
American women photographers
Photographers from Connecticut
20th-century American photographers
21st-century American women artists
21st-century American photographers
People from Meriden, Connecticut